Rasa is a mukim and town in Hulu Selangor District, Selangor, Malaysia. The word rasa means "taste" in Malay.

Since the 1900s Rasa has had a tin mining industry. Tan Boon Chia, a businessman in Selangor, was based in this town and his mansion, the Yuan Chin Hall along the main railway track, still survives. The town is known for its Hakka cuisine. Its the former seat of Hulu Selangor district administration.

Hulu Selangor District
Mukims of Selangor